Robassomero is a comune (municipality) in the Metropolitan City of Turin in the Italian region Piedmont, located about  northwest of Turin.

Robassomero borders the following municipalities: Nole, Cirié, Fiano, San Maurizio Canavese, Caselle Torinese, Druento, and Venaria Reale.

Robassomero is the first nuclear-free municipality (1981): the first in Italy. On 17 November 1981 the City Council approved a resolution from the highly symbolic Robassomero stated that "nuclear-free zone"
or area where it is forbidden to install nuclear weapons and nuclear power plants. This is for promoting peace among peoples, to use the resources of the planet to combat world hunger and protect the environment using renewable energy as an alternative to nuclear power. Since then, he started a broad movement across Italy against war and against nuclear danger that led to the denuclearization of many communities and cities.

See also: "Towns of the province of Turin", Vol V, Volume 2 - Necklace "MUNICIPALITIES OF PIEDMONT -
by the Regional Council of Piedmont - corporate communications of the Regional Directorate.
Printing Graphic Arts Giacone Srl - Chieri (Turin) - 2009

Demographic evolution

References

External links
 www.comune.robassomero.to.it

Cities and towns in Piedmont